Laryovo is a rural locality (a village) in Mytishchinsky District of Moscow Oblast, Russia, located on the banks of the Samoryadovka River.

Transportation
A104 (Moscow–Dmitrov–Dubna) road connects Laryovo with Moscow and various places in Moscow Oblast. There is bus service. Katuar railway station in Nekrasovsky is the closest to Laryovo, where suburban commuter trains, operated by the Central Suburban Passenger Company, can be taken to Moscow.

References

Notes

Sources

Rural localities in Moscow Oblast
Mytishchinsky District